The Missouri-Pacific Depot is a historic former railroad station on the south side of United States Route 64 (between 1st and 2nd Avenues) in Atkins, Arkansas.  It is a long rectangular single-story masonry building, finished in brick and stucco and covered by a hip roof.  At one end, the roof extends beyond the structure to form a sheltered area, and the telegrapher's booth projects from the building's south (track-facing) side.  It was built about 1910 by the Missouri-Pacific Railroad, and is typical of that railroad's period stations, having only lost its tile roof.

The depot was listed on the National Register of Historic Places in 1992.

See also
National Register of Historic Places listings in Pope County, Arkansas

References

Railway stations on the National Register of Historic Places in Arkansas
National Register of Historic Places in Pope County, Arkansas
Railway stations in the United States opened in 1910
Atkins
Former railway stations in Arkansas
Transportation in Pope County, Arkansas
1910 establishments in Arkansas
Late 19th and Early 20th Century American Movements architecture